The honours awarded by His Majesty, The King are published in the official Crown newspaper, the London Gazette, twice a year – at New Year, and in mid-June on the date of the King's official birthday, once per year as a special supplement for the King's Award for Voluntary Service on 14 November, and within various other Special Supplements for miscellaneous awards, honours and achievements.

There have been numerous awards of honours to members of the Special Constabulary across the United Kingdom of Great Britain and Northern Ireland, including individuals of all ranks, and team awards. These include the following:

 OBE – Officer of the Order of the British Empire
 MBE – Member of the Order of the British Empire
 BEM – British Empire Medal
 KPM – King's Police Medal
 KVS – King's Award for Voluntary Service

All of the honours listed above, apart from the King's Award for Voluntary Service allow for the use of the abbreviated post-nominal letters after the individuals name. Special Constables are also eligible for the Special Constabulary Long Service Medal after 9 years service as a volunteer Police Officer.

Invested Honour Recipients

Officer of the Order of the British Empire

Member of the Order of the British Empire

Medallist of the Order of the British Empire

Queen's Police Medal 
The Queen's Police Medal is only awarded to Special Constables in Scotland – at present, Special Constables across England and Wales are not eligible for the QPM.

Queen's Award for Voluntary Service 

The Queen’s Award for Voluntary Service is the highest award given to volunteer groups across the UK. Any group of 2 or more people doing volunteering work can be nominated for the award. The majority of the group must be volunteers, and more than half the volunteers must have the right to live in the UK.

To be nominated they should do work that:

 provides a service and meets a need for people living in the local community
 is supported, recognised and respected by the local community and the people who benefit from it
 is run locally

Volunteer groups should have been running for 3 years or more to be nominated.

Winners get a certificate signed by the Queen and a domed glass crystal. Representatives from the group may also be invited to attend a royal garden party.

References 

List of British special constables awarded honours
Special Constabulary
British special constables awarded honou